is a visual novel and the third entry in the "Sound Novel Evolution" series published by Chunsoft.

Gameplay
The game features a branching narrative.

Characters
Keima Amemiya: a detective
Jintarō Umabe: an actor
Masami Ushio: a gangster
Yoshiko Hosoi: a part-time worker
Masashi Shinoda: a university student
Ryūji Takamine: a legion deserter
Fumiyasu Ichikawa: a screenwriter
Yōhei Tobisawa: an idol
Atsushi Takamine: Ryuji's father
Norio Aoi: a pariah
Isamu Sagiyama: an assistant director
Patrick Dandy: a marriage swindler
Shōjirō Kaizuka: a politician

Reception
The game sold 164,866 copies in Japan. Famitsu scored the game 33 out of 40. It ranked fifth at the top 100 reader poll of their favorite games of all time. A proposed sequel to Machi was cancelled, but a chapter of it was adapted as a 1998 television miniseries Tōmei Shōjo Ea (Invisible Girl Ea). 428: Shibuya Scramble is set in the same location with many references. In 2017, Famitsu readers voted it one of the top five adventure games of all time.

References

External links
Machi at GameFAQs

1998 video games
Chunsoft games
Japan-exclusive video games
PlayStation (console) games
PlayStation Portable games
Sega Saturn games
Video games about police officers
Video games developed in Japan
Video games featuring female protagonists
Video games set in Tokyo
Video games with alternate endings
Visual novels